The Federal Correctional Institution, Cumberland (FCI Cumberland) is a medium-security United States federal prison for male inmates in Maryland. It is operated by the Federal Bureau of Prisons, a division of the United States Department of Justice. The facility also has a satellite prison camp for minimum-security male offenders.

FCI Cumberland also has a license plate manufacturing center, where inmates produce license plates used on federal government vehicles.

Notable incidents
On July 21, 2010, inmate and former NYPD Commissioner Bernard Kerik used the social website Twitter to post his opposition to the opening of the Park51 Islamic Community Center near Ground Zero. The post read, "If we let them defile ground zero with a beachhead for sharia we will validate their sense of victory on 9/11 and encourage future attacks on America. No mosque at Ground Zero" and included a link to a Web video showing the Twin Towers falling. A Federal Bureau of Prisons official told Salon, "Inmates don't have Internet access. He probably has a family member doing it for him." The official also said Kerik may have access to something called TRULINCS, a prison e-mail system that allows inmates to exchange e-mails with people (typically family members or friends) on an approved list.

Notable inmates

Current

Former

See also

 List of U.S. federal prisons
 Federal Bureau of Prisons
 Incarceration in the United States

References

External links
 Federal Correctional Institution Cumberland

Buildings and structures in Allegany County, Maryland
Cumberland
Cumberland
1994 establishments in Maryland